The following outline is provided as an overview of and topical guide to computers:

Computers – programmable machines designed to automatically carry out sequences of arithmetic or logical operations. The sequences of operations can be changed readily, allowing computers to solve more than one kind of problem.

What type of thing is a computer? 

Computers can be described as all of the following:
 Tools –
 Machines –
 Business machines –
 Systems –

Types of computers 
 Mainframe computer –
 Super computer –
 Midrange computer –
 Personal computer –
 Desktop computer –
 Microcomputer –
 Mobile computer and mobile device –
 Smartphone –
 Tablet computer –
 Laptop –
 Computer appliance –
 Business machine –
 Information appliance –
 Smartphone –
 Smart TV –

Computer architecture 

Computer architecture –

Computer components 
 Motherboard –
 Processor –
 Graphics processor –
 RAM –
 ROM –
 Floppy disk –
 Hard drive –
 Input devices –
 Keyboard –
 Keyboard technology –
 Projection keyboard –
 Roll-up keyboard
 Virtual keyboard –
 Wireless keyboard –
 Mouse –

Computer performance 

 Computer performance by orders of magnitude

Computing 
 See: Outline of computing

Computer science 
 See: Outline of computer science

History of computers 

History of computing hardware
Analog computers
 History of computer components
Punched cards
History of general purpose CPUs
History of the floppy disk
 History of personal computers

Computers and culture 
 Social media
 memes

Computer industry

Computer manufacturing 
 List of computer hardware manufacturers
Hewlett-Packard
Toshiba
Dell
Apple
Acer
Asus

Computer engineering 
 See: Outline of computer engineering

Software industry 
 Personal computers
 Microsoft
 Apple
 Linux
 Business computers
 IBM
 Oracle
 Internet
 Google
 Facebook
 Yahoo!
 AOL
 eBay
PayPal

Software development 
Software development –
 List of software development philosophies
 Programming language

Software engineering 
 See: Outline of software engineering

Computer organizations 

 Users' group   (list)

Computer publications 
Computer magazines –
See List of computer magazines
Online –
 CNET
 ZDNet
 Wired.com
 Wired.co.uk
 Huffington Post
 Techcrunch
 Engadget
 News Corp
 All things D

Persons influential in computers 
 List of pioneers in computer science
 Charles Babbage
 Alan Turing
 Grace Hopper
 Thomas J. Watson
 Thomas Watson, Jr.
 Bill Gates
 Paul Allen
 Steve Jobs
 Steve Wozniak
 Robert Noyce
 Andrew Grove
 Linus Torvalds

See also 

 Outline of computer engineering
 Outline of computer programming
 Outline of computer science
 Outline of computer security
 Outline of computer vision
 Outline of computing

References

External links 

outline
Computers
Computers